The chemical compound 1,3,5-trioxanetrione, or 1,3,5-trioxacyclohexane-2,4,6-trione is an unstable oxide of carbon with formula CO. It can be considered a cyclic trimer of carbon dioxide (CO) or as a triple ketone of 1,3,5-trioxane (1,3,5-trioxacyclohexane).
Trioxanetrione has been synthesized but is exceedingly unstable, with a half-life of approximately 40 min at −40 °C. It decomposes to give carbon dioxide.

References

Carbonate esters
Carboxylic anhydrides
Oxocarbons
Trioxanes
Lactones